Bruce Raymond Barmes (October 23, 1929 – January 25, 2014), nicknamed "Squeaky", was an American professional baseball player.

An outfielder, Barmes had an outstanding minor league career, notching a .318 career batting average and 1,627 hits in 1,439 games played over eleven full seasons (1950–60). He made All-Star teams in the Florida State League in 1950 and the Tri-State League in 1952, when he won the batting title with the Charlotte Hornets, and he helped his teams win league championships in his first three seasons of professional baseball. However, his major league career was simply a Cup of coffee during a late September call-up with the  Washington Senators.

His MLB debut came when he replaced Jackie Jensen as Washington's right fielder in the first game of a doubleheader at Griffith Stadium against the Detroit Tigers on September 13. He handled two chances in the field without an error and grounded out to second baseman Fred Hatfield against Ned Garver in his only at bat. Barmes' other four MLB appearances came as a pinch hitter. He earned his only MLB hit with a pinch single off Bob Trice of the Philadelphia Athletics on September 26.

Bruce Barmes was the uncle of MLB infielder Clint Barmes.

References

External links

1929 births
2014 deaths
Atlanta Crackers players
Baseball players from Indiana
Charleston Senators players
Charlotte Hornets (baseball) players
Chattanooga Lookouts players
Major League Baseball outfielders
Omaha Cardinals players
Orlando Senators players
People from Vincennes, Indiana
Washington Senators (1901–1960) players